Halil Bıçakçı (born 11 July 1926) is a Turkish professional football manager. Bıçakçı managed Altay when they won the 1966-67 Turkish Cup.

Honours
Altay
 Turkish Cup: 1966-67

References

External links
Mackolik Profile Archive
Spordb Profile
TFF Manager Profile

1926 births
Possibly living people
Sportspeople from İzmir
Turkish football managers
Süper Lig managers
Altay S.K. managers
İzmirspor managers